The 1991–92 English Premiership, (known as the Courage League for sponsorship reasons) was the fifth season of top flight rugby union in England. Each team played each other once. 

Bath were the champions, winning their third title, beating Orrell by one point. Nottingham and Rosslyn Park were relegated.

Participating teams

Table

Results
The Home Team is listed on the left column.

References

External links
Official website

Premiership Rugby seasons
 
English